The Strategic Command Operations of the Bolivarian National Armed Forces (CEOFANB) is one of the six branches of the National Bolivarian Armed Forces of Venezuela. It has the responsibility of guiding operations of the Venezuelan Armed Forces.

Admiral Remigio Ceballos is the current Commandant of the OSC, with Major General Jose Ornellas Ferreira as the Chairman of the Joint Chiefs of Staff (as of 2017), and the roles of the OSC have been updated with a recent amendment of the Organic Law of the National Armed Forces in 2014.

History
The Strategic Command Operations of Venezuela was founded by the late President Hugo Chávez on 26 September 2005, replacing the Unified Command of the National Armed Forces (CUFAN). Its mandate is to be the operational command for any operations that can be conducted by the National Armed Forces.

The OSC is led by a Commandant, assisted by the Chairman of the Joint Chiefs of Staff, who is also the deputy commandant. As it reports directly to the President and the Ministry of Defense, in recent years the Commandant has also been the Minister of Defense as well. He or she is appointed or relieved by the President.

Mission
The mission of the Strategic Command Operations of Venezuela is to assist the Venezuelan National Armed Forces in geographical and aerospace operations.

Part of its responsibility is providing a unified national air defense capability, as well as for holding joint exercises to enhance combat readiness.

Commanders
The commandants of the OSC have been:

(*): They were subsequently appointed defense ministers, and they were also promoted to the rank while holding the office of the OSC Commandant.

References

Military of Venezuela